Mallavi is a town in the Mullaitivu District, Sri Lanka. It has a population of about 5,000 and a crude education and healthcare system.

 
Towns in Mullaitivu District
Thunukkai DS Division